Deus ex machina (plural: dei ex machina; English "god out of the machine") is a plot device whereby a seemingly unsolvable problem in a story is suddenly and/or abruptly resolved by an unexpected and unlikely occurrence. Its function is generally to resolve an otherwise irresolvable plot situation, to surprise the audience, to bring the tale to a happy ending, and/or act as a comedic device.

Origin of the expression
Deus ex machina is a Latin calque . The term was coined from the conventions of ancient Greek theater, where actors who were playing gods were brought onto stage using a machine. The machine could be either a crane (mechane) used to lower actors from above or a riser that brought them up through a trapdoor. Aeschylus introduced the idea, and it was used often to resolve the conflict and conclude the drama. The device is associated mostly with Greek tragedy, although it also appeared in comedies.

Ancient examples
Aeschylus used the device in his Eumenides, but it became an established stage machine with Euripides. More than half of Euripides' extant tragedies employ a deus ex machina in their resolution, and some critics claim that Euripides invented it, not Aeschylus. A frequently cited example is Euripides' Medea, in which the deus ex machina is a dragon-drawn chariot sent by the sun god Helios, used to convey his granddaughter Medea away from her husband Jason to the safety of Athens. In Alcestis, the heroine agrees to give up her own life to spare the life of her husband Admetus. At the end, Heracles shows up and seizes Alcestis from Death, restoring her to life and to Admetus.

Aristophanes' play Thesmophoriazusae parodies Euripides' frequent use of the crane by making Euripides himself a character in the play and bringing him on stage by way of the mechane.

The device produced an immediate emotional response from Greek audiences. They would have a feeling of wonder and astonishment at the appearance of the gods, which would often add to the moral effect of the drama.

Modern theatrical examples

Shakespeare uses the device in As You Like It, Pericles, Prince of Tyre, and Cymbeline. John Gay uses it in The Beggar's Opera where a character breaks the action and rewrites the ending as a reprieve from hanging for MacHeath.  During the politically turbulent 17th and 18th centuries, the deus ex machina was sometimes used to make a controversial thesis more palatable to the powers of the day. For example, in the final scene of Molière's Tartuffe, the heroes are saved from a terrible fate by an agent of the compassionate, all-seeing King Louis XIV — the same king who held Molière's career and livelihood in his hands.

Plot device
Aristotle was the first to use a Greek term equivalent to the Latin phrase deus ex machina to describe the technique as a device to resolve the plot of tragedies. It is generally deemed undesirable in writing and often implies a lack of creativity on the part of the author. The reasons for this are that it damages the story's internal logic and is often so unlikely that it challenges the reader's suspension of disbelief.

Examples
 Ark of the Covenant, which serves largely as the MacGuffin in Steven Spielberg's Raiders of the Lost Ark (1981), serves as a deus ex machina at the ending of the film: When it seems that the protagonist, Indiana Jones, has been beaten by the Nazis, the wrath of God rises from the Ark and kills the antagonists.
 Avengers: Endgame writers Christopher Markus and Stephen McFeely admitted the time travel plot device in the 2019 film was the result of having written themselves into a corner in the previous movie. Also, the sudden arrival of Captain Marvel in the climax of the film has been criticized as bordering on a deus ex machina because "her late arrival to the final battle … feels like a function of her powers being too strong".
 The Great Eagles. J. R. R. Tolkien   The eagles have been critiqued as a deus ex machina.
 Lord of the Flies. A passing navy officer rescues the stranded children. William Golding called that a "gimmick", other critics view it as a deus ex machina. The abrupt ending conveys the terrible fate that would have afflicted the children if the officer had not arrived at that moment.
 Oliver Twist. Charles Dickens used the device when Rose Maylie turns out to be the long-lost sister of Agnes, and therefore Oliver's aunt; she marries her long-time sweetheart Harry, allowing Oliver to live happily with his savior Mr. Brownlow.
 The War of the Worlds. The Martians in H. G. Wells's have destroyed everything in their path and apparently triumphed over humanity, but they are suddenly killed by bacteria.

In medicine
In medicine, the phrase is often used for supposedly "magical remedies" which are not likely to work in practice. For instance, in the 2020 COVID-19 outbreak, when double lung transplantation for terminal COVID-19 patients was suggested, it was immediately denounced as a deus ex machina. In 2006, when electronic fetal heart monitoring was being touted as a preventive measure for cerebral palsy, The New England Journal of Medicine, denounced it as deus ex machina.

Criticism
The deus ex machina device is often criticized as inartistic, too convenient, and overly simplistic. However, champions of the device say that it opens up ideological and artistic possibilities.

Ancient criticism
Antiphanes was one of the device's earliest critics. He believed that the use of the deus ex machina was a sign that the playwright was unable to properly manage the complications of his plot.

Another critical reference to the device can be found in Plato's dialogue Cratylus, 425d, though it is made in the context of an argument unrelated to drama.

Aristotle criticized the device in his Poetics, where he argued that the resolution of a plot must arise internally, following from previous action of the play:

Aristotle praised Euripides, however, for generally ending his plays with bad fortune, which he viewed as correct in tragedy, and somewhat excused the intervention of a deity by suggesting that "astonishment" should be sought in tragic drama:

Such a device was referred to by Horace in his Ars Poetica (lines 191–2), where he instructs poets that they should never resort to a "god from the machine" to resolve their plots "unless a difficulty worthy of a god's unraveling should happen" [nec deus intersit, nisi dignus uindice nodus inciderit; nec quarta loqui persona laboret].

Modern criticism
Following Aristotle, Renaissance critics continued to view the deus ex machina as an inept plot device, although it continued to be employed by Renaissance dramatists.

Toward the end of the 19th century, Friedrich Nietzsche criticized Euripides for making tragedy an optimistic genre by use of the device, and was highly skeptical of the "Greek cheerfulness", prompting what he viewed as the plays' "blissful delight in life". The deus ex machina as Nietzsche saw it was symptomatic of Socratic culture, which valued knowledge over Dionysiac music and ultimately caused the death of tragedy:

Nietzsche argued that the deus ex machina creates a false sense of consolation that ought not to be sought in phenomena. His denigration of the plot device has prevailed in critical opinion.
 
In Arthur Woollgar Verrall's publication Euripides the Rationalist (1895), he surveyed and recorded other late 19th-century responses to the device. He recorded that some of the critical responses to the term referred to it as 'burlesque', 'coup de théâtre', and 'catastrophe'. Verrall notes that critics have a dismissive response to authors who deploy the device in their writings. He comes to the conclusion that critics feel that the deus ex machina is evidence of the author's attempt to ruin the whole of his work and prevent anyone from putting any importance on his work.

However, other scholars have looked at Euripides' use of deus ex machina and described its use as an integral part of the plot designed for a specific purpose. Often, Euripides' plays would begin with gods, so it is argued that it would be natural for the gods to finish the action. The conflict throughout Euripides' plays would be caused by the meddling of the gods, so would make sense to both the playwright and the audience of the time that the gods would resolve all conflict that they began. Half of Euripides' eighteen extant plays end with the use of deus ex machina, therefore it was not simply a device to relieve the playwright of the embarrassment of a confusing plot ending. This device enabled him to bring about a natural and more dignified dramatic and tragic ending.

Other champions of the device believe that it can be a spectacular agent of subversion. It can be used to undercut generic conventions and challenge cultural assumptions and the privileged role of tragedy as a literary/theatrical model.

Some 20th-century revisionist criticism suggests that deus ex machina cannot be viewed in these simplified terms, and contends that the device allows mortals to "probe" their relationship with the divine. Rush Rehm in particular cites examples of Greek tragedy in which the deus ex machina complicates the lives and attitudes of characters confronted by the deity, while simultaneously bringing the drama home to its audience. Sometimes, the unlikeliness of the deus ex machina plot device is employed deliberately. For example, comic effect is created in a scene in Monty Python's Life of Brian when Brian, who lives in Judea at the time of Christ, is saved from a high fall by a passing alien space ship.

See also

Notes

References

 Bushnell, Rebecca ed. 2005. A Companion to Tragedy. Malden, MA and Oxford: Blackwell Publishing. .
 Heath, Malcolm, trans. 1996. Poetics. By Aristotle. Penguin: London. .
 Janko, Richard, trans. 1987. Poetics with Tractatus Coislinianus, Reconstruction of Poetics II and the Fragments of the On Poets. By Aristotle. Cambridge: Hackett. .
 Mastronarde, Donald, 1990. Actors on High: The Skene roof, the Crane and the Gods in Attic Drama. Classical Antiquity, Vol 9, October 1990, pp 247–294. University of California.
 Rehm, Rush, 1992. Greek Tragic Theatre. Routledge, London. .
 Tanner, Michael ed. 2003. The Birth of Tragedy. By Nietzsche, Friedrich. Penguin: London. .
 Taplin, Oliver, 1978. Greek Tragedy in Action. Methuen, London. .
 Walton, J Michael, trans. 2000. Euripides: Medea. Methuen, London. .

External links
 
 

Ancient Greek theatre
Latin literary phrases
Plot (narrative)
Literary concepts
Narratology
Narrative techniques
Television terminology